Has is a region in north eastern Albania and south western Kosovo.

Hasi is an ethno-geographic area with well-defined borders, surrounded by river Black Drin to its West and south west in Albania and by the White Drin river on its south, east and north east in Kosovo. Hasi area is located in north-eastern part of Albania, while the south-western part remaining in Kosovo, in Gjakova area and a part that captures the Prizren area. This division occurred in 1913 at the Ambassadors Conference of London after the Balkan wars.

Hasi has an area of 371 kilometers square and has a population of around 40,000 in the Republic of Kosovo, while in the Republic of Albania it has an area of 374 kilometers square and a population of 21,500. In this way, Hasi has an area of 745 kilometers square and a population of 61,500.

Etymology
The name originates from hass, an Ottoman land revenue. The area was first mentioned as a hass in a 1570 document. In the early 17th century, many chroniclers mention the name of Has, struggling with the pronunciation of the letters h and s and so its name was seen in form of "Az" or "Ass". In the early 17th century, Has was also known as Has Shulla which in Latin means "dry places" according to its nature which remains the same even nowadays which becomes called Dry Has.

The name could also be derived from the word "Has", meaning "to meet".

Geography
"Has" region that is part of Republic of Albania doesn't contain the whole ethnographic region of Has. 

Has is an ethnographic province with well defined boundaries, surrounded all around with lakes. Its region in the parts of Albania is based on Kukes, and through the Kosovo side, it is divided in the Municipality of Gjakova, and one part in the Municipality of Prizren. Some of the main rivers in Has are Kruma, Vlahna, Rosman, Leshnica, Vogova, Racica, Trava and Deshtica while the main lakes are Kruma, Zym, Shigjeq and Fierza.

In Albania, Has consists of the following villages: Bardhaj (Maç), Brenogë, Cahan, Dobrunë, Domaj, Fajzë, Gajrep, Golaj, Gjinaj, Helshan, Kishaj, Kosturr, Krumë, Letaj, Liken i Kuq, Metaliaj, Mulaj, Nikoliq, Peraj, Perollaj, Pogaj, Pus i Thatë, Qarr, Tregtan, Vlahën, Vranisht, Zahrisht dhe Zgjeç and smaller hamlets of Brrut, Shalqin, Sefoll and Tobël.

In Kosovo, Has consists of the following villages:: Gorozhup, Milaj, Pllanejë, Kojushë, Mazrek, Gjonaj, Tupec, Karashëngjergj, Zym, Lukinaj, Krajk, Romajë, Dedaj, Lubizhdë e Hasit, Kabash i Hasit, Kushnin, Rogovë, Damjan, Gërçinë, Lipovec, Ujz, Fshaj, Bishtazhin, Smaq, Goden, Dol, Raçë, Moglicë, Zhub, Pjetërshan, Guskë, Vogovë, Brekoc, Zylfaj, Kushavec, Kusar, Firzë dhe Devë.

Climate
The highland of Has territory, on geographical basis has a climate of three main types such as: a) Continental climate with elements of Mediterranean Climate elements in the valley of the Drina and b) mountain climate which reigns in the hilly areas of Has. The Has part in which the impact of the Mediterranean climate is felt is characterized with hot and dry summers, with little precipitation. The average annual temperature reaches 11.4C. The month of January is the coldest month in this region where the average temperature is 0.4C - 0.9C, while higher temperatures meet during July and August with 22C and 22 C. Average amount of precipitation in Has ranges from 700 to 800 mm.

Natural resources
Hasi is considered to be very rich in natural resources and the main region is Vlanes with about 3,000,000 tons of chrome reserves containing 30-32% of Cr2O3 and special troops with over 40%. In this district there are other deposits in Gajrep, Gzhime, Perollaj and Mac, which are known with around 300,000 tonnes of chrome reserves.

Except chrome, there also known other copper viin deposits of quartz - sulfide in the massive Gabror in the areas of Nikolic 1 and 2 with about 2,000,000 tons of reserves, Golaj is considered to have around 1,000,000 tons. Mines of Golaj and Kurma are closed and are not being used. The distinguished copper reserves in the Has district are: Nikoliq-Golaj area, Krumë, Zahrisht, in the Has district. Albania is a big source of chromium and its areas with deposits are Vlahna and Perollaj. Areas rich in ferronickel and nickel silicate are those of Muç - Has areas with the fields of Gjinaj and Domaj along the lake shore of Fierza. Copper deposits of the Kruma Golaj, though with reservations, are off interest from business use due to the poor quality of the district minerals. They have underground counts for 14 million tons of chrome reserves.

History

According to tax registers from 1452, the region was inhabited by an Albanian population

Ottoman records indicate that during the 16th century, the Hasi region, which was part of the Nahiya of Hasi, was inhabited almost entirely by Albanians. The anthroponomy of the region's inhabitants were mainly Albanian.

Has full province has been divided after the Balkans War in the early twentieth century. This partition was sanctioned in the Ambassadors Conference in London in 1913. In the eastern part of Albania was set the borderline in 1913(which divided the nation in half) which is in border with the Republic of Kosovo.
Hasi's mutilation of the territory in the twentieth century created not only unprecedented isolation, but, deeper still, a spiritual division, cultural and ethnographic itself, which was experienced with no less pain. Today, the area of Hasi contains about 371 km ² and has a population of about 40,000 inhabitants, is part of the Republic of Kosovo.

Hasi Wars under centuries and their consequences
Hasi's territory was divided after the Balkan wars in the early twentieth century. The Ambassadors’ Conference in London in 1913 sanctioned the partition of the territory; a decision which put the ruthless Albanian land in being chopped to complete chauvinistic desires of Balkan states. This decision divided the Albanian territory and destroyed more than half of Albanian population.

Hasi had been this unfortunate as well, losing a part of its territory which was given to Serbia without taking into consideration that it composed a unique language, culture and traditions with heritage since antiquity. Long Roman, Byzantine, Slavic and Turkish invasions have forced populations to move from this area by issuing or thinning settlements by often taking refuge in the depths of Dukagjini and returning again.

Many medieval chroniclers, historians and scholars have determined Hasi as a Kastriotis country of origin. Many researchers that have dealt with this issue have come up with different opinions but the most convincing version is the origin from Kastriotis. According to Fran Bardhi as expressed in 1636 " After a controversial submission I conclude that Kastriotis that were from Hasi, Prizren" and this is today as the most reliable variant and a reliable source.

After the battle of Kosovo in 1389 the Turkish invasion in Albanian lands became faster and Hasi territories became prey to this occupation. It set the military feudal system and the residents had to pay multiple taxes. The population was violently converted into Muslims and a part of residents withdrew in mountainous areas where Christianity was still standing, while residents who remained were forced to change the religion. In these areas during the sixteenth century highland tribes such as Berisha, Bytyç, Gash, Krasniq, Kastrati, Morine, Shal, Thac, settled; a population which grew and consolidated Hasi's territory.

Demographics
Hasi is a province, where the most of population are Albanians, but in registrations before Second World War tell that in this province before II World War lived also different communities like : Serbians, Croatians, and Slovenians.

Those families after II World War never returned to Has, because of that was fresh in remind of population of Has. 
The registrations of 2011 result in this percentage of the Has population by age:
-age 0–14, 7837 people or 39.87%
-age 15–24, 3289 people or 16.07%
-age 25–59,  6996 people or 35.06%
-age 60–79, 1395 people or  7.1%
-age  80+,  143 people or 0.73%

Culture
 
Many Albanian and foreign authors have been interested in the typology of Albanian national costumes and about their age. Albanian Ethnographer Rrok Zojzi concludes that Albanian folk costumes belong to two main types of traditional clothing, the type of clothing with cloak and other variants.

We can conclude that men's wearing in Has is Tirq, although the work of men's wardrobe until the first half of the 20th century, in the region of Has have been using the technique of coating the kilt.

Wearing the kilt for men, up to the first years after World War II was also prevalent among residents of  Has villages in Albania, but after entering into cooperation  this clothing gradually disappeared and found no more use, while in the Has villages of Kosovo it found use up until the eighties, but it was not tailored by the residents anymore like it used to be.

Sights

Pashtriku
Pashtriku is the most famous mountain in the Has district which is known for its characteristic limestone rocks. On the right of the  greater heights of the mountain there lies a very deep hole with popular vocabulary called " the great pond"and the height 1700 m above sea level is the fountain of the Dragon (Dragovodi) which stands for very cold crystal water.
On top of Pashtrik there  is " the good tomb " Sarisalltik Baba who is visited by different peregrines especially during August who can see the pastures, caves and rare plants and animals such as wolves, boars, foxes, rabbits, bears, and wild goats, and is populated by different birds like falcons, eagles, sparrows, and so on. It provides a healthy curative environment especially for people who suffer from lung disease and asthma..
From the altitude the plateau of Kruma and the Dukagjini plane can be seen. The city of Gjakova looks like a flower between the fields and the other side of the lake is distinguished the city of Prizren. This ancient city stands as a crown between the four other cities becoming in this way a very interested place to be visited.

Daci Cave (2600 P.E.S—1200 P.E.S)
Daci Cave is located about 10 km at the east of Kruma. This cave is found in the neighborhood of Dac, of the village Mujaj. There has been archeological research in this cave from 1985 to 1987 from the archeologist Muhamet Bela. According to the research this cave was inhabited from the Bronze Age, Iron Age up until the early antiquity. The research during these years has shown the findings of knives, swords and different kinds of ceramics.

Cave of Pigeons
This cave is found in the ridge of Pashtriku Mountains, between village borders of Vlahen, Dobrune and Grecine and cave is found in between a Forest with rare vegetation that gives a special beauty, especially in Spring. This zone always has been used from touristic excursions.

Pine of Gjini
This pine is as crown between them and the village of more than a century, and it is between two sources who are in the midst of village Gjinaj.

Domaj Fountain
Is a very characteristic source with crystal water where and now it reserve her originality.

Legends says that river have two sources that came from Cahani Mountains and have the same water and flow from same sources and to prove that few decades ago one a cave in center of Cahani has cased color in cave and this color has shown in Vrell of Kruma and in water sources of  Domaj.

Archaeology
In the beginning of the 13th century (1208), the region in between Gjakova and Prizren, White Drini (Drini i Bardhe), Ereniku and Valbona, is named Patkovo  according to Slavic documents, a title also reserved a century later in Decan's Krisovula in 1330 and also in Shenearhangjel monastery in Prizren in 1570. A lot of historians in the beginning of the 17th century while arguing the origin of the Kastrioti tribe, mention the name with Az or As as well as the people of Askol who by absence of the use of 'h' and  's' in Latin means 'Has'. During the first years of the 17th century Hasi was known by the name Shulla which in Latin means 'Dry Lands' which is also a reason that modern Has is known as 'Dry Has' due to its geographical nature.

The scholar S.Pulaha links the name of the territory with Provinces of Hass according to cadastral registers made by the Ottomans during the 15th and 16th centuries. These territories were known as Provinces of Hass and included Rudina, Domeshtici and Pashtriku, which over time were unified by giving them the modern name of Has. There is little information about the population of Has, but those that are of interest include the relationship of Pjeter Mazrek, archbishop of Tivar during 1586–1637. He wrote in 1633 '' When this mountain and this river is passed you enter the province that elsewhere is called Shulla, but Hass on Serbian borders, this territory is inhabited by an infinite number of Albanians that are citizens of the Ottomans.

This archbishop later writes that Has includes a lot of villages populated by Albanians. The territory of Has has been populated since ancient times and there is preserved evidence of archaeological data from the Eneolithic (Copper Age), (2600–2200).

From the study of early culture, in particular from inquiries and the exploration of settlements and cemeteries, a lot of material has been found that sheds light on the formation of culture and Illzrian ethnicity. Except the findings in the case of Golaj, Helshan, Fajya e Brrut, there have been archeological expeditions by renowned scholars who have come to the conclusion that this nation belongs to ancient Dardania.

In Has there are ancient fortified residences, both open and cave-like. The most specified archeological sites in Has are: The residence of Kruma (Ulez) (explored in 1967) where there were found 24 tombs, 8 of which were thoroughly researched and there was found a rich inventory of ceramics, guns and other assorted metal tools that date in the first period of the 12th - 8th century B.C. During the years 1970–1972 the tomb of Romaja was explored, necrolipses of which gave rich archaeological material similar to that of the tomb of Kruma. In 1987, the three tombs of Mujaj were explored and the findings even though small, were chronologically well established to define the Iron Age, specifically the 6th and 5th century B.C. Such uncharted territory lies in abundance in the Has, like Golaj, Perollaj, Helshan, Fajza, Tregtan, Brrut etc.

Cave settlements have spread in the area of such high of Has. Dajci Cave has been studied in 1985–1987 which has been inhabited since the Bronze era, antique iron to the earlier representation; such are the township of Lipavec and Dobruna. Fortified settlements have started life before civilization and are located in dominant points built with stone and lime mortar.

For the slaves they were known by the name "Gradina" and the place where the hills were was called Gradishta. To the ancient authors they were known by the name CASTELLUM. During the late antiquity and medieval time there was the castle in Kosturr e Pus te Thate, whereas later the Leka's Castle was built. Other known settlements in the surroundings are: the Golaj municipality with the villages: Golaj, Nikoliq, Vlahen, Dobrune, Helshan, Kosturr, Perollaj, Zjec, Letaj, Qarr, Bardhaj and the municipality of Fajza and Gjinaj. Many historians associate the origin of the national hero Gjergj Kastriot Skenderbeu with the surroundings of Hasi, where the Mazrrek tribe is thought to be related to Skenderbeu's tribe.

Flora and fauna
Animals that grow in the area are tailored with the Has climate and vegetation on which the most common are beech, Qarri, Bunga, Poplar, Buy, Škoza rennet, Frasheri, wild hazelnuts with a little thirsty and conifers are prevalent. Wild animals (rabbits, fox, wolf, wild boar, bear, deer, wild goats, wild cat, etc. ) and wildfowl as thellenxa, eagle, dove, hawk, sparrow, rennet, are spread all around the territory. The use of oak forests (Has Dushkajën) and natural resources, for simple economic necessity, as the easiest way without spending led to significant damage. The natural environment underwent significant changes, that created a distinct separation barrier between nature and the neighboring states. This destruction of nature deepened in the early 1990s, where cruelty and exploitation of natural resources for economic purposes (outside state control) was associated with reductions of extinction of biological potentials, as well as a considerable number of ecosystems.

The gradual destruction of a good part of the habitat is the basic cause of the decrease in population of wild fauna. This is observed in wild boar, deer etc. Hasi district today has 296 shotgun permit data, of which only 70 are equipped with these hunter weapon in the hunters ' association and pay all obligations, subject to applicable laws and regulations, the rest having hunting weapons, does not hold for jewelry.

See also
Has District, Albania

References

Prizren
Regions of Kosovo
Albanian ethnographic regions
Kosovo Ethnographic Regions